Oberthueria yandu is a moth in the Endromidae family. It is found in China (Sichuan, Zhejiang, Jiangxi, Fujian and eastern Tibet).

Adults have a chestnut brown ground colour, with an admixture of dark yellow colours on the hindwings and with dense suffusion of ash grey scales. The pattern is distinct, although the postmedian is vague. The submarginal fascia is white. Adults are on wing from late March to early July and again from August to early October in two generations per year.

References

Moths described in 2013
Oberthueria (moth)
Moths of Asia